One of The Oldest Passenger Train of Northeast Frontier Railway 

Timings
The train covers total distance of 253 Kilometres.

Route
 (starts)
 
 
 
 
 
 
 
 
 Falakata
 
 
 
 
 
 
 Kamakhyaguri
 Jorai
 
 
 
 
 
 
 Basugaon
 
 Bongaigaon (Ends)

Locomotive

Rake Sharing
The train shares its rake with New Jalpaiguri -Malda Town Express.

References

Alipurduar railway division
Rail transport in West Bengal
Rail transport in Assam
Express trains in India
Transport in Jalpaiguri
Transport in Bongaigaon

See also
New Jalpaiguri -Malda Town Express